South Korean hip hop and R&B singer, Kim Hae-sol, better known by his stage name Zion.T, has released one studio album, three extended plays, and 10 singles. He debuted in April 2011 with his self-composed single "Click Me" which features Dok2.

Albums

Studio albums

Extended plays

Singles

As lead artist

Collaborations

As a featured artist

Other charted songs

Soundtracks

Music videos

Notes

References

External links
 Zion.T discography on Melon

Discographies of South Korean artists